The accolades of American actress and director Chloë Sevigny include two Golden Globe Award nominations (including one win), two Independent Spirit Award nominations (including one win), and an Academy Award nomination for Best Supporting Actress.

Sevigny made her feature film debut in Kids (1995), for which she was nominated for an Independent Spirit Award for Best Supporting Actress. She would subsequently appear in several independent films before portraying Lana Tisdel, a woman who unknowingly falls in love with a trans man, in the biographical drama Boys Don't Cry (1999). For her portrayal, Sevigny earned an Academy Award nomination for Best Supporting Actress, as well as Golden Globe Award and Screen Actors Guild Award nominations in the same category; she was the recipient of a Satellite Award for Best Supporting Actress.

After appearing in numerous feature films throughout the 2000s, Sevigny would earn further critical acclaim for her portrayal of Nicolette Grant, a Mormon fundamentalist, on the HBO series Big Love, earning a Satellite Award nomination for Best Supporting Actress in a Series, Miniseries, or Television Film in 2009. The following year, Sevigny won a Golden Globe Award for Best Supporting Actress in a Series, Miniseries, or Television Film for her portrayal of Grant in the series' third season. Sevigny received further critical recognition for her appearance on the British miniseries Hit & Miss (2012), earning a third Satellite Award nomination.

Academy Awards
The Academy Awards are a set of awards given by the Academy of Motion Picture Arts and Sciences annually for excellence of cinematic achievements.

American Film Institute
The AFI Fest is an annual festival held by the American Film Institute that screens and honors films by American filmmakers.

Cannes Film Festival
Founded in 1955, the Cannes Film Festival is an annual film festival held in Cannes, France, which presents awards in various categories honoring achievements in international filmmaking.

Golden Globe Awards
The Golden Globe Award is an accolade bestowed by the 93 members of the Hollywood Foreign Press Association (HFPA) recognizing excellence in film and television, both domestic and foreign.

Independent Spirit Awards
The Independent Spirit Awards are presented annually by Film Independent, to award best in the independent filmmaking.

MTV Movie Awards
Founded in 1992, the MTV Movie Awards is an annual award show presented by MTV to honor outstanding achievements in film. The award winners are decided online by the audience.

Satellite Awards
The Satellite Awards are presented annually by the International Press Academy.

Screen Actors Guild Awards
Established in 1995, the Screen Actors Guild Awards are presented annually by the Screen Actors Guild‐American Federation of Television and Radio Artists, and aim to recognize excellent achievements in film and television.

Critics associations

References

External links
 

Lists of awards received by American actor
Lists of awards received by film director